Aliaksei Uladzimiravich Protas (born 6 January 2001) is a Belarusian professional ice hockey centre for the Washington Capitals of the National Hockey League (NHL). Protas previously played two seasons of major junior for the Prince Albert Raiders of the Western Hockey League (WHL), and was selected 91st overall by the Washington Capitals in the 2019 NHL Entry Draft. He made his professional debut in 2020 with Dinamo Minsk of the Kontinental Hockey League. Internationally Protas has played for the Belarusian national junior team at two World Junior Championships.

Playing career
Protas started his career in his hometown of Vitebsk. He spent two seasons with the Belarus U17 team that played in the Vysshaya Liga, the second league in Belarus, before being selected 26th overall by the Prince Albert Raiders in the 2018 CHL Import Draft. He joined the Raiders for the 2018–19 season, and finished with 40 points in 61 games. Heading into the 2019 NHL Entry Draft Protas was the 30th ranked North American skater, and was selected 91st overall by the Washington Capitals. He played for Prince Albert in 2019–20 season, which was ended prematurely due to COVID-19; in 58 games he had 80 points, which placed him ninth in the WHL in scoring and the highest European player.

For the 2020–21 season Protas was loaned to HC Dinamo Minsk of the Kontinental Hockey League (KHL). He had 18 points in 58 games, and an additional 4 points in 5 playoff games. With Minsk's season over, Protas was re-assigned to the Hershey Bears, the Capitals' American Hockey League affiliate.

During the 2021–22 NHL season, Protas was called up to the Capitals, and he scored his first career NHL goal on 28 November 2021, during a 4–2 victory over the Carolina Hurricanes.

Career statistics

Regular season and playoffs

International

Awards and honours

References

External links
 

2001 births
Living people
Belarusian ice hockey centres
HC Dinamo Minsk players
Hershey Bears players
Sportspeople from Vitebsk
Prince Albert Raiders players
Washington Capitals draft picks
Washington Capitals players